The Bitburger-wfv-Pokal is one of the 21 regional cup competitions of German football. The winner of the competition gains entry to the first round of the German Cup. It was introduced in 1945. In 2011 the cup was renamed from WFV-Pokal into Bitburger-wfv-Pokal because of a new name sponsoring by the brewery Bitburger. WFV stands for Württembergischer Fußball-Verband (football association of the region Württemberg).

History

The competition was established in 1945 in the Württemberg part of Württemberg-Baden and in Württemberg-Hohenzollern. In 1952, these two states merged with South Baden to form Baden-Württemberg but three separate football associations, Württemberg, Baden and South Baden, remained and also their regional cups.

Initially, the final was held at a neutral ground but from 1967 onwards, one of the two finalists received home advantage. Occasionally, it would however still be held at a neutral venue when the club with the home advantage didn't have a suitable stadium. After 1981, the competitions final returned to a neutral venue.

From 1974 onwards, the winner of the WFV Cup qualified for the first round of the German Cup. At times, the WFV was permitted to send both, winner and finalist to the first round of the German Cup, currently (2008–09), it is only the winner as Württemberg is not one of the three largest federations, which are permitted to send two clubs.

Possibly the most remarkable WFV-Cup winner in terms of German Cup appearance was the SC Geislingen in 1984–85. The club drew Hamburger SV for the first round and beat the Bundesliga club 2–0, then defeated Kickers Offenbach 4–2 to go out in the third round 0–2 to the later winners Bayer Uerdingen.

Modus
Professional clubs are not permitted to enter the competition, meaning, no teams from the Bundesliga and the 2. Bundesliga can compete.

All clubs from Württemberg playing from the 3. Liga to the four Landesligas (VII) gain direct entry to the first round. To make up the set number of 128 clubs for the first round, the best teams from the Bezirkspokale, which teams below tier seven play in, are also admitted.

Cup finals
Held annually at the end of season, these were the cup finals since 1950:

 Source: 
 Winners in bold.

Winners
Listed in order of wins, the Cup winners are:

 1 Includes one win by SSV Ulm.
 2 Includes one win by VfL Heidenheim.

References

SourcesDeutschlands Fußball in Zahlen'',  An annual publication with tables and results from the Bundesliga to Verbandsliga/Landesliga, publisher: DSFS

External links
Fussball.de: Württemberg Cup 
Württemberg football association website 
Die Endspiele um den wfv-Pokal der Herren seit 1950/51 WFV website – List of Cup finals 

Recurring sporting events established in 1945
Football cup competitions in Germany
Football competitions in Baden-Württemberg
1945 establishments in Germany